Dang Sarak (also Romanized as Dengesarak; also known as Dengesarak-e Yek) is a village in Qareh Toghan Rural District, in the Central District of Neka County, Mazandaran Province, Iran. At the 2006 census, its population was 2,008, in 577 families.

References 

Populated places in Neka County